Segato is an Italian surname. Notable people with the surname include:

Armando Segato (1930–1973), Italian footballer
Girolamo Segato (1792–1836), Italian naturalist, cartographer, Egyptologist, and anatomist
Guglielmo Segato (1906–1979), Italian cyclist
Lorraine Segato (born 1956), Canadian singer-songwriter
Nicola Segato (born 1987), Italian footballer
Rita Laura Segato (born 1951), Argentine-Brazilian academic

See also
Massimo Serato (1916–1989), born Giuseppe Segato, Italian actor

Italian-language surnames